Bendungan Hilir (or abbreviated "Benhil") is an administrative village in the Tanah Abang district of Indonesia. It has a population of 20,025 people.

Pejompongan and Bendungan Hilir neighborhood
Pejompongan and Bendungan Hilir were two residential neighborhoods located to the west side of Krukut River and bounded by Penjernihan Road, Jalan Jenderal Gatot Subroto and Sudirman Road. The neighborhoods were located to the north of Gelora Bung Karno sport complex. Pejompongan and Bendungan Hilir were among the first neighborhood developed after independence period.

With the planning and development of Gatot Subroto Road in the 1950s, 25 hectares of land at Pejompongan and 6 hectares land at Bendungan Hilir were opened in 1952 for the development of a new housing. This housing were developed particularly for civil servants who needed to stay in Jakarta to do their duty.

The other 15 hectares of land at Pejompongan was opened for a water purification plant that was completed in 1957 (hence the name of the road, Penjernihan ("purification") road. In the 1960s, both the northern part of Pejompongan and Bendungan Hilir had already been established.

Design of both neighborhoods follow the Garden City principle.

See also 
 Tanah Abang
 List of administrative villages of Jakarta

References

Cited works

Administrative villages in Jakarta